Pago Youth is an American Samoan football club located in Pago Pago, American Samoa. It currently plays in the FFAS Senior League, the nation's top-division football league, and has won it eight  times, making Pago Youth the most successful club in American Samoa.

Honors 

FFAS Senior League (8):

2008, 2010, 2011, 2012, 2016, 2017, 2018, 2019

Squad
2022 Squad

Reserve Team 
Pago Youth also has a Reserve team (Pago Youth B team), which also plays in the ASFA Soccer League.

References 

Football clubs in American Samoa